USS LST-223 was a  in the United States Navy during World War II. She was later sold to France as Rance (L9004).

Construction and career 
LST-223 was laid down on 31 March 1943 at Chicago Bridge & Iron Co., Seneca, Illinois. Launched on 24 August 1943 and commissioned on 17 September 1943.

Service in the United States 
During World War II, LST-223 was assigned to the Asiatic-Pacific theater. She took part in the Battle of Kwajalein and Majuro Atolls from 31 January to 8 February 1944 and the Leyte landings from 20 October and 19 to 29 November 1944. She also participated in the invasion of Saipan from 15 to 24 June 1944.

On 15 September 1945, she was redesignated as LST(H)-223.

LST-223 was decommissioned on 1 May 1946 and later struck from the Navy Register.

Service in France 
She was transferred to the French Navy and commissioned in March 1947 with the name Rance (L9004).

The ship was beached at the Suez Canal during the Suez Crisis on 8 November 1956.

Rance took part in the Algerian War between 1 November 1954 to 19 March 1962 and the First Indochina War between 19 December 1946 to 1 August 1954.

The ship was out of service on 8 March 1961 and later sold for scrap.

Awards 
LST-223 have earned the following awards:

American Campaign Medal
Asiatic-Pacific Campaign Medal (3 battle stars)
World War II Victory Medal
Navy Occupation Service Medal (with Asia clasp) 
Philippines Presidential Unit Citation 
Philippines Liberation Medal (1 award)

Citations

Sources 
 
 
 
 

World War II amphibious warfare vessels of the United States
Ships built in Seneca, Illinois
1943 ships
LST-1-class tank landing ships of the United States Navy
Ships transferred from the United States Navy to the French Navy